Olga Karlatos (born Olga Vlassopulos, April 20, 1945) is a retired Greek actress and Bermudian lawyer, known primarily for performing in Italian horror cinema.

Career 

Between the end of the sixties and the early seventies, Karlatos had a short career as a singer, recording an EP and some singles in French and Italian, including the theme song of the drama Eneide of which she starred as Dido, the legendary queen of Carthage. In 1975 she took part in the film My Friends, directed by Mario Monicelli, in which he played Donatella, the unhappy wife of the surgeon Alfeo Sassaroli.

During the eighties she participated in the film of Mauro Bolognini The Lady of the Camellias (1981), with Isabelle Huppert, she later played the starring role in Lucio Fulci giallo film Murder Rock (1984), a small part in the film of Sergio Leone Once Upon A Time In America (1984), and the film musical Purple Rain (1984) with Prince, in which she played the singer's mother.

She also appeared in such television productions as Peter and Paul (1981), The Scarlet and the Black (1983), Quo Vadis? (1985) and Miami Vice (1986).

Post-acting career
In 2007, Karlatos graduated from Kent University with a law degree and was admitted to the Bermuda Bar Association in 2010.

Personal life
Karlatos married French filmmaker Nikos Papatakis in 1967. The couple had one child together, son Serge (b. 1967) before their divorce in 1982. The next year, she wed American director, producer and writer Arthur Rankin after he cast her in a television adaption of The Picture of Dorian Gray, The Sins of Dorian Gray. They later settled in Bermuda.

Filmography

Film

Television

References

External links

 

1945 births
Greek film actresses
Greek television actresses
Greek women lawyers
Greek expatriates in Bermuda
Actresses from Athens
Living people
Alumni of the University of Kent
20th-century Greek actresses